The 2001 Rink Hockey World Championship was the 35th edition of the Rink Hockey World Championship, held between 29 September and 7 October 2001, in San Juan, Argentina. It was disputed by 15 countries. The final watched Spain beating hosts Argentina to claim their 11th title.

Venue

Format 

The competition was disputed by 15 countries, divided in four groups of 3 or 4 teams each one.

Every game lasted 40 minutes, divided in 2 parts of 20 minutes.

Matches

Group stage

Group A

Group B

Group C

Group D

Championship Knockout stage

5th place bracket

9th to 16th place Knockout stage

13th place bracket

Final standings

References

External links 
 Official (Archived 2009-07-22)

Roller Hockey World Cup
Rink Hockey World Championship
Rink Hockey World Championship
International roller hockey competitions hosted by Argentina
Rink Hockey World Championship